The Numbers Gang is a crime organization that started as a prison gang with one of the most fearsome reputations in South Africa. Although they were founded in KwaZulu-Natal, it is believed that they are present in most South African prisons. The gang is divided into groups or camps named the 26s, 27s and 28s or the other non gang members called 'Frans' partially meaning no number..

Origin and history

The Numbers Gang was started in the late 1800s, supposedly to protect black mineworkers. The origins of the gang remain uncertain at best. Amongst gang members, the likely apocryphal story of Nongoloza and Ngeleketshane is claimed as the gang's origin.

The Numbers Gang story holds that a man named Paul Mambazo became alarmed by the exploitation of miners in late 1800 South Africa. Paul allegedly befriended a young zulu boy, a member of the Zulu called Nongoloza who said he was on his way to the mines to look for work, and Ngeleketshane, a member of the Pondo tribe. Paul eventually recruited 15 young men. He taught them a secret language and highway robbery. The men robbed travellers and colonial outposts of their goods. The gang chose to change their habits to avoid being caught. They moved from cave to cave and split themselves into two groups: Ngeleketshane with his seven men who robbed by day, and Nongoloza and his six men who robbed by night. Paul ordered the two men to carve their daily outlaw activities on a nearby rock which would serve as a diary.

Paul then ordered the two men to visit a farm, owned by a Mr. Rabie, and to buy one of his bulls called Rooiland (Red Earth). Mr. Rabie was suspicious, and refused to sell the two men the bull. The two youths refused to leave without carrying out their order, and proceeded to stab the farmer with bayonets and then steal the bull, and slaughter it for a feast.

Paul ordered the men to take the hide of the bull and press it onto the diary rock until the words from the rock were imprinted on the hide. There were now two copies of the gang's ways, and Paul explained that the bandits must follow the rules as they had been set out from the beginning. The two items were divided between the two men: Nongoloza received the hide and Ngeleketshane received the rock. The two were instructed to carry them wherever they went. The rock, however, proved too awkward to carry and one day it was accidentally dropped down a hill. It split into two pieces, one of which fell into a river. This left Ngeleketshane's gang with only half of the gang's laws.

The first conflict between the two gangs took place because of this incident. The two gangs decided to embark on a joint expedition, but Nongoloza said he was sick and stayed behind. He asked one of Ngeleketshane's soldiers, Magubane, to stay behind with him. Upon returning, Ngeleketshane found Nongoloza engaged in homosexual acts with Magubane. Enraged, Kilikijan challenged Nongoloza to a fight. Nongoloza replied that according to the hide, sex between bandits was allowed in order to avoid contact with women. Kilikijan retaliated by saying that he didn't trust Nongoloza, believing he had added this law to the hide after half of the rock was lost. The two men fought until they were both drenched in blood, and Paul arrived to intervene.

Paul listened to both men's sides of the story. He then told Ngeleketshane to travel to the mines to see if men were engaging in sex with one another. Ngeleketshane found that this did indeed take place, but opinions remained divided as to whether this justified Nongoloza's act. This would become the pivotal disagreement between the two gangs that persists to this day. Paul had informed the men that at the entrance of his cave was an old assegai, and if the men found the tip of the assegai rusted, it would mean that Paul had died. Due to the death of Paul, a final decision on whether sexual intercourse between men was allowed never came to pass.

After Paul's death the two gangs decided to go their separate ways: Nongoloza's gang with its now eight men (including Magubane, whom he decided to take with him), and Kilikijan's gang with its seven. It is said that this is where the numbers "27" and "28" originated, with the number "2" symbolizing the two leaders. The gangs agree that the day and night would still be divided between them as it had always been. The gangs continued to roam the countryside until they both ended up in Point Prison in Durban.

At Point Prison they encountered a group of six men, led by a Zulu man from the south of KwaZulu-Natal named Grey, who were franse (non-gangsters). The six men would sit in a circle and flip a single silver coin between them. Nongoloza demanded that the men hand over their possessions to him; they refused. Later Ngeleketshane told him that these men were skilled smugglers and gamblers who had helped him in his early days in prison. A fight broke out between Nongoloza and Ngeleketshane about the future of the gamblers. Ngeleketshane defended the gamblers against the 28s' sexual appetites, which was what Nongoloza wanted them for.

After many disagreements Nongoloza finally decided that the new group would be called the "26s" also known as Izisebenzi. This name was chosen because they had six men but also because Nongoloza wanted to indicate their inferior status. Nongoloza informed Ngeleketshane that he and his men would have to answer for the actions of the 26s.

Finally the three camps were formed. The 26s were responsible for gambling, smuggling and accruing wealth in general. The 28s were the warriors and responsible for fighting on behalf of all three groups, and the 27s were the guardians of gang law and the peace keepers between all the gangs.

New rules and a strict code of conduct were drawn up. It was decided that when a gangster broke a rule, the blood of a warder or franse (non-gangster) must be spilled to set things right.

From early 20th century Mzuzephi Mathebula made headlines in the city of Durban also known as eThekwini by recruiting men to join his gang the 28s also known as Amalaita but was over powered by the 26s influence in the city. The 26s have a big membership but the 28s still  stands out against the 26s.

Number

26s 
The 26s' duty is to accumulate wealth for all the numbers. The 26s have no private line and a wyfie may not join the gang. Although a member of the 26s may take a wyfie for himself, it is strictly against the laws as set out in the book of 26s. The 26s run all prisons in the province of KwaZulu-Natal and are mostly active in Durban and uMgungundlovu district of Pietermaritzburg.

In the number 2s and the number 1s there is a number 1's and number 2's twelve point ring, for number 4's and 5's, but not 6's or 7's, who have an 11 point ring, unless they're number 8's, which make gang decisions according to their jurisdictions. Each rank has its own assigned office and duties which include training lower rank members in the duties and codes of the gang.

28s
The 28s are the blood line of the gang and are responsible for fighting on behalf of the three gangs (26, 27 and 28). They are divided into two lines – the gold line and the silver line. Haysom's study (1981) on prison gangs is based on Supreme Court trial records and supplemented with some interviews with ex-offenders. Schurink's paper (1989) summarises the findings of a study on prison gangs commissioned by the Department of Correctional Services. For this study, in-depth interviews were conducted with sixty prisoners, mainly Coloured men serving in St Albans and Brandvlei prisons. Prisoners were also encouraged to write about their prison experiences, providing a number of personal manuscripts. The 28s might run prisons like Brandvlei, St Albans and Pollsmoor prison it is believed they haven't been able to run prisons in KwaZulu-Natal because of the 26s power in the prisons.

The gold line are the warriors, the descendants of Nongoloza. They fight the gang's battles.

The silver line are the female, and are the descendants of Magubane. They are considered to be the sex slaves of the gold line.

In the 28s it is important to prove your manhood and move up in the rankings. A member moves up the ranks through the stabbing or killing of rival gangs, prison guards, or disobedient members. Should a member stay in the lower ranks, he will be considered a woman and will be sexually abused until he proves his manhood.

Recruitment into the 28s
When a new prisoner is assigned a cell he will be introduced to the person in charge of that cell, known as the "cell cleaner". The cell cleaner will welcome the new prisoner to the cell, and will either leave him alone for the evening, or will demand intercourse.

The new prisoners will be observed by a senior member of the gang known as "die glas" (the binoculars). The glas' job is to conduct gang business in die bos (the bush), the parts of the prison where the 28s are not active. The glas will confront a potential new recruit and give him a riddle. How the new prisoner answers the riddle will determine which department of the gang he will fall under.

After the glas is satisfied with the answer of the new inmate, he is given a task to become a member. This task could either be the fatal or non-fatal stabbing of another inmate or warden. The new recruit will be given a knife whose length is determined by another senior member of the gang known as the nyangi (the doctor). If the gang wants the stabbing to be fatal, the nyangi will give the new recruit a longer blade; if the gang wants a non-lethal stabbing, he will be given a shorter blade.

Once the stabbing has taken place all the gang members watching will shout, "Nangempela! Die nommer is vol!" (The number is complete.)

On a Sunday, the "day of rites", his ceremony is performed. He is once again ordered to stand in the middle of the room; however, this time he is surrounded by several people. The first person to approach him is the nyangi. The nyangi then takes a gold pipe and slaps it on the new recruit's right wrist, then takes a silver pipe and slaps it on the new recruit's left wrist. He then checks the recruit's pulse and declares either "Die man se pols klop twee keer per jaar" (This man's pulse beats twice a year) or "Die man se pols klop drie keer per jaar'" (This man's pulse beats three times a year). If he says that his pulse beats twice, it means the new recruit is being recruited into the silver line; if three times, it means he is being recruited into the gold line.

The  (senior member) then places a handkerchief on the floor and slips a knife under it. He stands and says to the recruit: "From today you are no longer a franse. You are a 28. You will never swear at your brother. You will never hurt your brother. You will never do anything that reflects badly on the camp. If you leave the camp, you leave by your own blood."

The  (magistrate) will then come forward and take out his colored stamps and give the new member his approval. The  carries four stamps – white, green, red and black, which signify the four hooves on the Rooiland. The stamps signify promotion. When a member of the silver line is promoted, the landdros takes out his green and white stamp; if the member is from the gold line, he takes out the green and the red stamps. The black stamp is reserved for the death sentence.

The end of the ceremony is signalled by the new recruit being marched out of the circle. The 28s then take the new recruit to the 26s and 27s.

The new recruit will sleep alongside different members of the 28 gang and be told what his duties are. He will also begin to learn the history of Nongoloza and Kilikijan. It will only be a brief fragment of the story, for he is still too junior to hear the whole story.

The 40s are senior but inactive due to being too old or too injured for active duty. A prison cannot have two active nyangis, for example, and if another  is transferred from another prison he is considered dormant – he sleeps in the 40s.

It is a long and gruelling process. The new member has to sabela all day and night with his blackboard (teacher). In the first two months a new member is not allowed to receive visits, write letters or read books. They must focus on the number gang. If somebody learns too slowly, the punishments are severe. New members can be stripped of all their clothes and thrown into an ice cold shower until they "find the number" (get it right).

One of the last things new members learn is about a position in the silver line held by a man named Mtjoetijies. This man is dead, but his place in the hierarchy is left empty. Legend has it that Mtjoetijies was a translator for Nongoloza, who refused to speak the language of the white oppressor. Nongoloza grew increasingly wary about what Mtjoetijies was saying to the white officers, and decided to kill him as a precaution. The position remains open as a reminder that the 28s do not negotiate with words, they negotiate with action.

This ritual, however, has now changed. The fundamental principles remain the same; however, in modern 28 law the man who trains you is now also allowed to have sex with you. This change came along because of the war between the silver and gold lines of the number.

The 28s War
In the late '80s a decision was taken to stop bloodlines (no stabbing). The silver line complained that the gold line were now not doing their jobs. The gold line complained about the silver line being greedy with food. In the days when the bloodlines were still open the gold line members had a very strict diet to follow as they were not allowed to get fat. For example, they were not allowed to eat eggs and were never allowed sugar with their coffee or porridge. All these items went to the silver lines instead. Upon the closing of the bloodlines the gold line demanded that they get the food they wanted since there was no longer a need to stay fit. The silver line refused, and thus the gold line declared war on the silver line.

Within months hostilities had ceased. The hospital beds were filled with soldiers from the 28 gang.

The gold line formally offered their surrender. The silver line then set out their terms. They closed down the gold line and vowed that it would never be opened again. They threw the soldiers out of their ranks and filled these ranks with silver line members. They then decreed that nobody would have to take blood to join the 28s again. They also changed the initiation rules: they stated that any person who wished to join the 28s had to have sex with their teacher.

The rule of the blood has, however, changed. Modern members are now expected both to kill upon order of their general, as well as to have sex with their teacher. They are also expected to know the "Number" to the extent that the new members are often woken up in the middle of the night and asked the "Number"; if they get it wrong they either have to have sex with any fellow brother or are asked to kill another inmate.

27s

The 27s are the most secretive division and they enforce gang law. It is believed that there was major conflict between the 26s and 28s and so the 27s were acting as mediators between the two groups. 

They believe in the Island's of Bailiwick and McDonald's is King. Only one wireless operator is available and will carry out communication.

Relationships

Relationship between the numbers
The two 28s are not allowed to speak directly to the 26s. They communicate through the 27s. When the 28s recruit a new member, the 28s inform the 27s who then inform the 26s. This is seen as a "hands off" warning to the other gangs.

Relationships with franse (non gang members)

The  is stripped of his juridical personhood. He is not seen as a human to the gangs.

Relationship with warders
The relationship between gang members and the warders is a complex and an uneasy one. Under the apartheid regime they feared the warders.  They knew that the warders would not be watched by human rights groups, so when there was a stabbing of an officer the warders would beat the gang members to within an inch of their lives.

Under the new system, however, the warders have become targets. The numbers gangs are well aware that the consequences of their actions will not result in a beating or the death penalty, and therefore new initiates are encouraged to stab a warden or even to attempt to take his eye out of the socket.

One of the most compelling messages that the numbers gang members like to send to the warders is by holding up a mirror toward the warden. This derives from the traditional practice of holding up an image of an inmate. The message the numbers are said to be sending is, "We are what you are. You are an army, we are an army. Where you have a head of the prison, we will have a judge. Where you have a head of a section, we will have a general. Whatever you do to us, we will do to you in turn."

The numbers network
One notable feature of the numbers gang is that it is a nationwide brotherhood that is prevalent in every prison across South Africa.

Members that betray the gang are not safe in almost any South African prison, as the numbers control all but a few prison in South Africa. The secretive nature of the gang makes their system of communicating to other prisons unknown.

General elections
Traditionally the 28 gang has been the dominant gang in western cape prisons. This still holds true in prisons such as Pollsmoor prison. However, the balance of power now varies from prison to prison over time. When one of the number gangs feels it can take control of the prison, they declare a "general election" in which an all-out war is waged, often lasting up to two years, until one gang is declared the "ruling party". Two famous cases of these wars were in Belville prison (1967–1969) and in Brandvlei prison (1974–1976). In both cases the 26s were declared the "ruling party".

Trial and punishment

Punishments
The gang has a strict code of conduct and failure to abide by these rules has severe consequences for the perpetrator.

Upon the outcome of the trial a punishment is chosen. The ultimate punishment is death. An execution squad will carry out the order. They could possibly suffocate the offender in their bed or slit their throat. The death punishment is known as a "number one".

The second worst punishment just short of death is to be raped by a prisoner that is known to carry HIV. This practice is known as "slow puncture". The offender's anus is cut open so it bleeds, thus ensuring infection. The gang holds the offender down and the HIV-infected prisoner proceeds to rape the offender.

Less severe forms of punishment include "klappe" (hits), which involves 10 slaps to the face with an open hand, and the "beker" (mug), which involves blows on the head with a tin cup attached to a sock.

Other forms of punishment include gang rape and what is known as a "carry on", in which the offender lifts up his arms and is beaten with padlocks, stick and cups.

Punishments that do not involve any harm to the offender involve the murder of a non-gang member.

Other numbers gangs 
There are other number gangs who are not recognized by the 26s, 27s and 28s. The Desperadoes are the 29s and the Big Five are the 25s, but they are referred to as "dirty dogs" and are not given the same status or respect as members of the numbers gang. Under certain conditions it is compulsory to kill a member of the Big Five gang and new gangs called raf4, raf3 broke away from the 26 and vice versa with the raf4 28.

See also
 Umkosi Wezintaba

References

Information sources
 «God’s children», Heather Parker Lewis, 2006 – 
 «Nongoloza's Children: Western Cape Prison Gangs During and After Apartheid», Jonny Steinberg
 Van Zyl Smit, Dirk "South African prison law and practice", Butterworths, 1992
 Durban. Haysom, N. (1981). Towards an understanding of prison gangs Institute of Criminology, University of Cape Town. Cape Town

Prison gangs
Gangs in South Africa